

Portugal
Angola – 
 José Maria de Sousa Macedo Almeida e Vasconcelos, Governor of Angola (1829–1834)
 Military junta (1834–1836)

United Kingdom
 Malta Colony – Frederick Cavendish Ponsonby, Governor of Malta (1827–1835)
 New South Wales – Major-General Richard Bourke, Governor of New South Wales (1831–1837)
 Western Australia – Captain James Stirling, Governor of Western Australia (1828–1839)

Colonial governors
Colonial governors
1834